Acanthodoris nanega is a species of sea slugs, a dorid nudibranch, a shell-less marine gastropod mollusc in the family Onchidorididae.

Distribution 
This species was described from Victoria, Australia. It is found on shore and in shallow water to 30 m depth.

References

Onchidorididae
Gastropods described in 1969